David Parkes may refer to:
David C. Parkes, British-American computer scientist
David Parkes (footballer, born 1892) (1892–1975), English football player for Sheffield Wednesday and Rochdale
David Parkes (footballer, born 1950), Irish football player

See also
David Parks (disambiguation)